Bogdan Diklić (born 1 August 1953) is a Serbian actor. He has been active since the late 1970s and starred in over one hundred Yugoslav films and television series. Diklić made ten films with director Goran Marković. In August 2009, he received the Lifetime Achievement Award "Pavle Vujisić" for his body of work in Yugoslav cinematography.

Selected filmography

References

External links

1953 births
21st-century Serbian male actors
21st-century Serbian writers
20th-century Serbian male actors
20th-century Serbian writers
Living people
People from Bjelovar
Serbian male actors
Serbian male stage actors
Serbian male television actors
Serbian male film actors
Serbian male voice actors
Serbs of Croatia
Yugoslav male film actors
Yugoslav male television actors
Serbian screenwriters
Male screenwriters
Serbian film producers
Serbian film directors
Serbian theatre directors
Croatian Theatre Award winners
Golden Arena winners